Mark B. Rosenberg (born August 15, 1949) is a professor and former university administrator who served as the president of Florida International University from August 2009 until January 2022 and former Chancellor of the State University System of Florida. He is member of the Council on Foreign Relations think tank and has testified before the United States Congress numerous times. He also served as a consultant to the U.S. Department of State and the U.S. Agency for International Development. Rosenberg earned a Bachelor of Arts degree in political science with Omicron Delta Kappa honors in 1971 from Miami University in Ohio. He earned his Master of Arts in political science in 1971 and a Ph.D. in political science with a graduate certificate in Latin American and Caribbean Studies in 1976 from the University of Pittsburgh.

Florida International University
Rosenberg's academic career began at FIU in 1976 as an assistant professor of political science. In 1979, he founded the FIU Latin American and Caribbean Center, a National Center on Latin America, designated by the US Department of Education, funded by Title VI, recognizing it as one of the top Latin American and Caribbean Centers in the country. Rosenberg subsequently served as the Founding Dean of the College of Urban and Public Affairs and Vice Provost for International Studies. He has also been a Visiting Distinguished Research Professor at The Peabody College of Vanderbilt University, and a Visiting Professor at the Instituto Tecnologico de Monterrey (ITESM) in Mexico.

Rosenberg suddenly resigned from the university effective January 21, 2022, citing deteriorating health conditions of his wife. Just a week later it was revealed that he stepped down because he had made aggressive advances to a younger female employees, "causing discomfort," and creating a hostile work environment. One woman who worked closely with Rosenberg told a colleague that Rosenberg had harassed her for months, triggering an investigation. He was succeeded by Kenneth A. Jessell as interim president, previously FIU's chief financial officer and senior vice president for finance and administration.

See also

References

External links

Living people
University of Pittsburgh alumni
Miami University alumni
Florida International University faculty
Chancellors of the State University System of Florida
Presidents of Florida International University
1949 births
Academic staff of the Monterrey Institute of Technology and Higher Education